Svetlana about Svetlana is a 2008 film that explores the life and literary works of Svetlana Alliluyeva, Joseph Stalin's daughter. It is the story of Lana Parshina and her attempt to find Svetlana Alliluyeva and, ultimately, to find some answers to the questions about Alliluyeva's autobiographical book Twenty Letters to a Friend that Lana read when she was ten.

References
Svetlana about Svetlana - synopsis - Cannes Film Festival - 2008

External links

2008 films
2008 short documentary films
American short documentary films
2000s Russian-language films
Documentary films about women writers
Russian short documentary films
2008 directorial debut films
2000s English-language films
2000s American films